Lush Life is a solo album by pianist Tete Montoliu recorded in 1971 and released on the Danish label SteepleChase in 1986.

Reception

Scott Yanow of AllMusic wrote: "This set finds the great pianist Tete Montoliu performing his fresh and virtuosic interpretations of six standards, plus two versions of Perry Robinson's "Margareta" and his own original 'Dia Inolvidabli'. A typically excellent and swinging set".

Track listing
 "Airegin" (Sonny Rollins) - 2:44
 "You Don't Know What Love Is" (Gene de Paul, Don Raye) - 6:04
 "Yesterdays" (Jerome Kern, Otto Harbach) - 5:34
 "Lush Life" (Billy Strayhorn) - 5:58
 "Margareta"  [take 1] (Perry Robinson) - 4:22
 "Dia Inolvidabli" (Tete Montoliu) - 4:47
 "Margareta" [take 2] (Robinson) - 5:36
 "Willow Weep for Me" (Ann Ronell) - 4:54
 "Imagination" (Jimmy Van Heusen, Johnny Burke) - 5:17

Personnel
Tete Montoliu – piano

References

Tete Montoliu albums
1986 albums
SteepleChase Records albums
Solo piano jazz albums